ARRB may refer to:
 Australian Road Research Board, a research organisation studying Australia's roads
 Assassination Records Review Board